Point Blank is an American rock band hailing from Irving, Texas, United States. The band formed in 1974 in Irving, Texas, and recorded six albums between 1974 and 1982. Garnering occasional airplay on AOR radio stations, the band is best known for their 1981 hit single, "Nicole" and their prior hit "The Hard Way" gained much exposure. They toured with many bands, such as: Aerosmith, ZZ Top, Kiss, Marshall Tucker Band, Lynyrd Skynyrd, Blue Oyster Cult, Johnny & Edgar Winter, Bad Company, J. Geils Band, and Ted Nugent.
After playing concert arenas, playing before thousands each night, POINT BLANK decided to call it a night in 1983. Most of the band members either continued playing locally in Dallas/Ft. Worth area and/or started their own successful businesses.

History
The band was discovered and managed by Bill Ham's Lone Wolf Productions (ZZ Top, Jay Boy Adams, and Eric Johnson). The original six albums were recorded in Memphis with engineer/producer Terry Manning.  Point Blank's sound is rooted in southern rock and boogie, but drifted towards hard rock and mainstream AOR by the early 1980s. In 1981, they released their fifth album, American Exce$$, which included the hit single "Nicole". With strong air-play on AOR radio stations the track reached #20 on Billboard Magazine's Rock Tracks chart.  Subsequently, "Nicole" was also released as a 45 RPM single and peaked inside the Top 40, at #39 on Billboard's Hot 100.  In their heyday they were known for their relentless touring, sometimes playing more than 200 shows per year. In 1984, the band broke up.

The band's core members reunited for a benefit concert in 2005. The benefit concert, held on September 17, 2005 was recorded and became a new live album titled Reloaded.  After its initial release, they continued touring. In late 2009, Point Blank released Fight On!, their first studio album in 27 years. Both the Reloaded and Fight On! albums were released on the Dixiefrog label.

Bassist Phillip Petty died from cancer on June 7, 2010.  Guitarist Kim Davis died on October 18, 2010 from a self-inflicted gunshot wound, aged 58. The studio musician Michael Hamilton, who played keyboards for the group died, also from cancer, on May 13, 2011.

In January 2014, the band completed Volume 9,  a Kickstarter-funded project originally titled Locked, Stocked and Two Smoking Barrels.

Replacing bassist Philip Petty after his death was Kirk Powers. In 2012, after receiving a phone call from Billy Gibbons recommending him, the band hired drummer Greg Hokanson.

James Russell Burns, better known as Rusty Burns, died in Denver from lung cancer on February 19, 2016, aged 63.

The singer and a founding member, John O'Daniel, died from cancer on November 17, 2018, he was 70. The last surviving founding members are Richard Heaton & Buzzy Gruen.

Discography
Point Blank (Arista, 1976) 
Second Season (Arista, 1977)
Airplay (MCA, 1979)
The Hard Way (MCA, 1980)
American Exce$$ (MCA, 1981)
On A Roll (MCA, 1982)
Reloaded (Dixiefrog, 2006)
Fight On! (Dixiefrog, 2009)
Volume 9 (Fairway, 2014)
Very Best (2019)

Members
Bold = Original members

1974
Rusty Burns – Guitar/Bass
Kim Davis – Guitar
John O'Daniel – Vocals
Richard Heaton – Drums

1975
Rusty Burns – Guitar/Bass
Kim Davis – Guitar
John O'Daniel – Vocals
Richard Heaton– Drums

1976
Rusty Burns – Guitar
Kim Davis – Guitar
John O'Daniel – Vocals
Buzzy Gruen – Drums

1979
Rusty Burns – Guitar
Kim Davis – Guitar
John O'Daniel – Vocals
Buzzy Gruen – Drums
Bill Randolph – Bass

Steve Hardin – Keyboards

1980
Rusty Burns – Guitar
Kim Davis – Guitar
John O'Daniel – Vocals
Buzzy Gruen – Drums
Bill Randolph – Bass

1981
Rusty Burns – Guitar
Kim Davis – Guitar
Buzzy Gruen – Drums
Bill Randolph – Bass
Bubba Keith – Vocals
Mike Hamilton – Keyboards

2005 
Rusty Burns – Guitar
John O'Daniel – Vocals
Phillip Petty – Bass
Buzzy Gruen – Drums

2007
Rusty Burns – Guitar
John O'Daniel – Vocals
Phillip Petty – Bass
Mike Gage – Drums
Buddy Whittington – Guitar 
Jeff Williams – Piano

2008
Rusty Burns – Guitar
John O'Daniel – Vocals
Phillip Petty – Bass
David Crockett – Drums
Mouse Mayes – Guitar
Larry Telford – Keyboards

2012
Rusty Burns – Guitar
John O'Daniel – Vocals
Mouse Mayes – Guitar
Larry Telford – Keyboards
Kirk Powers – Bass
Greg Hokanson – Drums

2014
Rusty Burns – Guitar
John O'Daniel – Vocals
Mouse Mayes – Guitar
Larry Telford – Keyboards
Kirk Powers – Bass
Mike Gage – Drums

2016
John O'Daniel – Vocals
Mouse Mayes – Guitar
Larry Telford – Keyboards
Kirk Powers – Bass
Greg Hokanson – Drums

References

American southern rock musical groups
Rock music groups from Texas
Musical groups reestablished in 2007
Hard rock musical groups from Texas
Heavy metal musical groups from Texas